Community Christian College (CCC) is a private Christian two-year college located in Redlands, California, United States.

Accreditation
Since 2007, Community Christian College has been accredited by Transnational Association of Christian Colleges and Schools (TRACS).

References

External links
Official website

Nondenominational Christian universities and colleges
Buildings and structures in Redlands, California
Universities and colleges in San Bernardino County, California
Educational institutions established in 1994
Transnational Association of Christian Colleges and Schools
1994 establishments in California